3C 58 or 3C58 is a pulsar (designation PSR J0205+6449) and supernova remnant (pulsar wind nebula) within the Milky Way that is possibly associated with the supernova of 1181. There are, however, signs that indicate that it could be several thousand years old, and thus not associated with that supernova. The object is listed as No. 58 in the Third Cambridge Catalogue of Radio Sources.

The pulsar is notable for its very high rate of cooling, which is unexplained by standard theories of neutron star formation. It is hypothesized that extreme conditions in the star's interior cause a high neutrino flux, which carries away the energy so that the star cools.
3C 58 has been proposed as a possible quark star.

It is located 2° northeast of ε Cassiopeiae and is estimated to be 10,000 light-years away. Its rotation period is 65.7 ms (so PSR J0205+6449 does not belong to the class of millisecond pulsars).

References

External links

Article about 3C58
What is known about 3C 58
Image from Aladin

Quark stars
Pulsars
058
Cassiopeia (constellation)